Andreas Grimsø  (2 August 1917 – 3 January 2004) was a Norwegian politician.

He was elected deputy representative to the Storting for the period 1969–1973 for the Conservative Party. He replaced Håkon Kyllingmark at the Storting from October 1969 to March 1971.

References

1917 births
2004 deaths
Conservative Party (Norway) politicians
Members of the Storting